The Karchambu District is a district (bakhsh) in Buin va Miandasht County, Isfahan Province, Iran.  The District has two rural districts (dehestan): Karchambu-e Jonubi Rural District and Karchambu-e Shomali Rural District,

References 

Buin va Miandasht County
Districts of Isfahan Province